Anurag Kashyap (born November 23, 1991) was the winner of the 2005 Scripps National Spelling Bee. He also won the Jeopardy! Teen Tournament in 2008.

Biography
Kashyap was born in Muzaffarpur, India and raised in Poway, California. He entered his first spelling bee for Poway Unified School District when he was in fourth grade at Valley Elementary School, and continued competing as a student at Meadowbrook Middle School. In 2004, he placed 47th in the national spelling bee.

In the 19th round of the 2005 Scripps National Spelling Bee, 13-year-old eighth-grader Kashyap successfully spelled the word appoggiatura, which is defined as "a note of embellishment preceding another note and taking a portion of its time." He won about $28,000 in cash and prizes, most of which he saved towards college.

In 2008, Kashyap competed in the 25th season of the Jeopardy! Teen Tournament. At the end of the ten-day tournament, Kashyap defeated Bradley Silverman from Georgia and Audrey Hosford from Maryland to become only the second student to win the Scripps National Spelling Bee and the Teen Tournament (the first was 1992 Spelling Bee and 1996 Teen Tournament champion Amanda Goad).

Kashyap graduated from Rancho Bernardo High School in San Diego, California in 2010, and had also studied at the Salk Institute in La Jolla, California, first as a summer intern with Inder Verma doing stem cell research in 2008. He enrolled at MIT with intentions to study biological sciences, graduated with a Bachelor's in 2015, and got his Master of Engineering in 2016.

Kashyap returned to competitive quizzing in adulthood, and won the Mimir's Well Carnation championship in May 2022.

See also
 List of Scripps National Spelling Bee champions

References

External links
Kashyap's Jeopardy! Teen Tournament player profile (archive)

American Hindus
American people of Indian descent
American spellers
Jeopardy! contestants
People from San Diego
Spelling bee champions
Scripps National Spelling Bee participants
Living people
1991 births
People from Muzaffarpur
Rancho Bernardo High School alumni